Hardly Art is an American independent record label based in Seattle, Washington. Founded in early 2007 by Sub Pop Records, Hardly Art is run by three full-time employees and is distributed by the Alternative Distribution Alliance (ADA) and Sub Pop. The label's name comes from a lyric from the song "No Culture Icons" by the Thermals. In 2016, the label was recognized for its contributions to independent music with a Genius Award Nomination from The Stranger.

Selected artists

 Arthur & Yu
 The Beets
 Carissa's Wierd
 Chastity Belt
 Colleen Green
 Dude York
 Fergus & Geronimo
 Gazebos
 Gem Club
 Grave Babies
 Hunx and His Punx
 Ian Sweet
 Jenn Champion
 Lala Lala
 La Luz
 La Sera
 Le Loup
 Protomartyr
 S
 Seapony
 Shannon and the Clams
 Tacocat
 The Dutchess & the Duke
 The Julie Ruin
 The Moondoggies
 The Sandwitches
 Versing

Release history

References

External links
 

American independent record labels
Companies based in Seattle
Record labels established in 2007